The Serbian Football Championship was the unofficial championship of Serbia organized by the Belgrade Football Subassociation (a Belgrade branch of the Football Association of Yugoslavia was covering territory of former Kingdom of Serbia, Vojvodina and eastern part of Bosnia and Herzegovina) and had two editions in 1920 and 1921, before Subotica Football Subassociation started its own championship in 1922 in Bačka region. It was a pioneer football championship in Serbia, and one of the predecessors of the Yugoslav Football Championship which started being played in 1923.

Seasons
The editions were:
1919–20 Serbian Football Championship (winner: BSK Belgrade)
1920–21 Serbian Football Championship (winner: BSK Belgrade)
1921–22 Serbian Football Championship (winner: SK Jugoslavija)

References

External links
 Yugoslavia/Serbia (and Montenegro) - List of Champions at RSSSF

   
Defunct football leagues in Serbia